The Helena Montana Temple is a temple of the Church of Jesus Christ of Latter-day Saints (LDS Church) under construction in Helena, Montana, United States.

History 
Plans to build a temple in Helena were announced on April 4, 2021, by church president Russell M. Nelson. In June 2021, the LDS Church released the location and rendering for the planned temple, with a groundbreaking, to signify beginning of construction, announced for later in the month.  The groundbreaking was held on June 26, 2021. It is anticipated to take 18 months to construct.

See also

 The Church of Jesus Christ of Latter-day Saints in Montana
 Comparison of temples of The Church of Jesus Christ of Latter-day Saints
 List of temples of The Church of Jesus Christ of Latter-day Saints
 List of temples of The Church of Jesus Christ of Latter-day Saints by geographic region
 Temple architecture (Latter-day Saints)

References

External Links
Helena Montana Temple Official site
Helena Montana Temple at churchofjesuschristtemples.org

The Church of Jesus Christ of Latter-day Saints in Montana